In mathematics, specifically differential and algebraic topology, during the mid 1950's John Milnorpg 14 was trying to understand the structure of -connected manifolds of dimension  (since -connected -manifolds are homeomorphic to spheres, this is the first non-trivial case after)  and found an example of a space which is homotopy equivalent to a sphere, but was not explicitly diffeomorphic. He did this through looking at real vector bundles  over a sphere and studied the properties of the associated disk bundle. It turns out, the boundary of this bundle is homotopically equivalent to a sphere , but in certain cases it is not diffeomorphic. This lack of diffeomorphism comes from studying a hypothetical cobordism between this boundary and a sphere, and showing this hypothetical cobordism invalidates certain properties of the Hirzebruch signature theorem.

See also 

 Exotic sphere
 Oriented cobordism

References 

Differential topology
Algebraic topology
Topology